Bob Bryan and Mike Bryan defeated Michaël Llodra and Fabrice Santoro in the final, 6–7(6–8), 6–3, 3–6, 7–6(7–3), 6–4 to win the doubles tennis title at the 2003 Tennis Masters Cup. It was their first Tour Finals title.

Ellis Ferreira and Rick Leach were the reigning champions, but did not compete that year.

Seeds
Champion seeds are indicated in bold text while text in italics indicates the round in which those seeds were eliminated.

Draw

Finals

Red group
Standings are determined by: 1. number of wins; 2. number of matches; 3. in two-players-ties, head-to-head records; 4. in three-players-ties, percentage of sets won, or of games won; 5. steering-committee decision.

Blue group
Standings are determined by: 1. number of wins; 2. number of matches; 3. in two-players-ties, head-to-head records; 4. in three-players-ties, percentage of sets won, or of games won; 5. steering-committee decision.

External links
 2003 Tennis Masters Cup Doubles Draw

Doubles
2003 ATP Tour